Mervyn Richard Crossman (7 April 1935 – 20 June 2017) was an Australian field hockey player, who won the bronze medal with the Men's National Team at the 1964 Summer Olympics in Tokyo, Japan. Four years earlier, when Rome, Italy hosted the Games, he made his Olympic debut.

Crossman played 32 times for Australia at the senior level, scoring 8 goals and was a renowned penalty corner hitter. He died in Townsville, Queensland on 20 June 2017.

References

External links
 
 
 
 

1935 births
2017 deaths
Australian male field hockey players
Olympic field hockey players of Australia
Olympic bronze medalists for Australia
Olympic medalists in field hockey
Field hockey players at the 1960 Summer Olympics
Field hockey players at the 1964 Summer Olympics
Medalists at the 1964 Summer Olympics
Field hockey people from Queensland